Liana Del Balzo (4 March 1899 – 26 March 1982) was an Italian film actress. She appeared in 90 films between 1935 and 1979. She was born in Buenos Aires, Argentina and died in Rome, Italy. Even making her film debut quite late, in her forty, Del Balzo was one of the most active character actresses in the Italian cinema, usually cast in humorous roles. She was also active on stage and in the operetta, in which she met her husband-to-be, the tenor Guido Agnoletti.

Selected filmography

 Casta Diva (1935)
 A Wife in Danger (1939) - Una invitata alla festa di nozze
 The Dream of Butterfly (1939)
 We Were Seven Widows (1939) - Passenger
 It Always Ends That Way (1939) - La cameriera dell' albergo
 Torna, caro ideal! (1939) - Madame de Villet
 Le educande di Saint-Cyr (1939) - L'insegnante di musica
 Ballo al castello (1939)
 Scandalo per bene (1940)
 One Hundred Thousand Dollars (1940) - Miss Vernon
 Kean (1940) - Una invitata al ballo
 La canzone rubata (1940) - La portinaia
 La fanciulla di Portici (1940) - La duchessa Carafa
 Idyll in Budapest (1941)
 Tosca (1941) - La dama di compagnia della marchesa (uncredited)
 Caravaggio (1941)
 Orizzonte dipinto (1941)
 I mariti (Tempesta d'anime) (1941)
 The King's Jester (1941) - La marchesa che nasconde l'età
 A Woman Has Fallen (1941) - Una vicina di casa
 Sancta Maria (1942) - Una passeggera sulla nave
 Soltanto un bacio (1942) - Un invitata alla festa di fidanzamento
 La principessa del sogno (1942) - Una amica della cantante lirica
 Miliardi, che follia! (1942) - Una invitata alla festa
 La signorina (1942)
 Sette anni di felicità (1942) - La cantante sul camion
 The Woman of Sin (1942)
 Harlem (1942)
 La danza del fuoco (1943)
 Sempre più difficile (1943) - La direttrice del collegio svizzero
 Apparizione (1943) - Susanna, la governante
 La storia di una capinera (1943)
 Il diavolo va in collegio (1944) - Signora Testones
 Eugênia Grandet (1946)
 L'apocalisse (1947)
 Cab Number 13 (1948) - (segment "Il castigo")
 Toto Looks For a House (1949) - La contessa (uncredited)
 The Pirates of Capri (1949) - Minor Role (uncredited)
 Santo disonore (1950) - Minor Role  (uncredited)
 Romanzo d'amore (1950) - Guest at the Continis'
 The Thief of Venice (1950) - La duenna
 Strano appuntamento (1950)
 Love and Blood (1951)
 Shadows Over Naples (1951)
 The Ungrateful Heart (1951)
 Seven Hours of Trouble (1951) - Donna Lucrezia (uncredited)
 Quo Vadis (1951) - Minor Role (uncredited)
 Una bruna indiavolata! (1951) - Mamma di Giulio
 Wife for a Night (1952)
 In Olden Days (1952) - Spettatrice al processo (segment "Il processo di Frine") (uncredited)
 Don Lorenzo (1952)
 Finishing School (1952) - Princess De Vick-Beranger
 Il romanzo della mia vita (1952) - The Woman in Trattoria (uncredited)
 Una donna prega (1953) - Una vicina curiosa
 Verdi (1953) - (uncredited)
 Neapolitan Carousel (1954) - Minor Role (uncredited)
 I cavalieri della regina (1954)
 Beautiful but Dangerous (1955) - (uncredited)
 Bravissimo (1955)
 Noi siamo le colonne (1956) - Madre di Sofia
 Valeria ragazza poco seria (1958)
 Le cameriere (1959)
 The Moralist (1959) - The Baroness (uncredited)
 Ben-Hur (1959) - Guest at Banquet (uncredited)
 The Cossacks (1960) - Grandduchess, Aunt of Tsar (uncredited)
 The Dam on the Yellow River (1960)
 The Night They Killed Rasputin (1960)
 Toto, Fabrizi and the Young People Today (1960)
 It Started in Naples (1960) - Minor Role (uncredited)
 Five Golden Hours (1961) - Minor Role (uncredited)
 Come September (1961) - Mother Superior (uncredited)
 I masnadieri (1961) - Acilia (uncredited)
 Sodom and Gomorrah (1962) - Rich Hebrew Woman
 Imperial Venus (1962) - Principessa Borghese
 La donna degli altri è sempre più bella (1963) - Old Lady on the Beach (segment "Bagnino Lover") (uncredited)
 I gemelli del Texas (1964) - Madre di Makenzie
 Il disco volante (1964) - la madre di Dolores
 The Taming of the Shrew (1967) - Minor Role (uncredited)
 Zorro alla corte d'Inghilterra (1969) - Woman at party (uncredited)
 Giacomo Casanova: Childhood and Adolescence (1969) - Woman attending sermon (uncredited)
 Shango (1970) - Taña
 Mr. Superinvisible (1970)
 Cross Current (1971) - Mrs. Foschi
 Colpo grosso... grossissimo... anzi probabile (1972)
 Novelle galeotte d'amore (1972)
 La prima notte di quiete (1972) - Signora Dominici, Daniele's mother (uncredited)
 Il gatto di Brooklyn aspirante detective (1973) - Adelina Bacherozza De Porcaris - the grandmother
 Deep Red (1975) - Elvira
 La Cage aux Folles (1978) - Mme Charrier
 La Luna (1979) - Maestro's Sister (uncredited)

References

External links
 
 

1899 births
1982 deaths
Italian film actresses
People from Buenos Aires
20th-century Italian actresses